Eurycleidus is an extinct genus of large-bodied rhomaleosaurid known from the Early Jurassic period (most likely earliest Hettangian stage) of the United Kingdom. It contains a single species, E. arcuatus. Like other plesiosaurs, Eurycleidus probably lived on a diet of fish, using its sharp needle-like teeth to catch prey. Its shoulder bones were fairly large, indicating a powerful forward stroke for fast swimming.

Phylogeny
Most phylogenetic analyses find the type species of the genus, Eurycleidus arcuatus, to be a relatively basal rhomaleosaurid. A second species, E. megacephalus (Stutchbury, 1846 [originally Rhomaleosaurus megacephalus]), was reassigned to this genus by Smith (2007). However, most analyses find E. megacephalus to represent an unnamed genus, which is distinct from both Eurycleidus and Rhomaleosaurus. E. megacephalus was moved to its own genus Atychodracon by Adam Smith in 2015.

The cladogram below shows E. arcuatus phylogenetic position among other plesiosaurs following Benson et al. (2012).

See also
 Timeline of plesiosaur research

 List of plesiosaurs

References

Rhomaleosaurids
Early Jurassic plesiosaurs of Europe
Fossil taxa described in 1922
Taxa named by Charles William Andrews
Sauropterygian genera